This is a list of signaling peptide/protein receptor modulators

Adiponectin

AdipoR1
 Agonists: Peptide: Adiponectin
 ADP-355
 ADP-399; Non-peptide: AdipoRon
 (–)-Arctigenin
 Arctiin
 Gramine
 Matairesinol

 Antagonists: Peptide: ADP-400

AdipoR2
 Agonists: Peptide: Adiponectin
 ADP-355
 ADP-399; Non-peptide: AdipoRon
 Deoxyschizandrin
 Parthenolide
 Syringing
 Taxifoliol

 Antagonists: Peptide: ADP-400

Angiotensin
 See here instead.

Bradykinin
 Agonists: Bradykinin
 Kallidin

 Antagonists: FR-173657
 Icatibant
 LF22-0542

Calcitonin gene-related peptide receptor
 Agonists: Amylin
 CGRP
 Pramlintide

 Antagonists: Atogepant
 BI 44370 TA
 CGRP (8-37)
 MK-3207
 Olcegepant
 Rimegepant
 SB-268262
 Telcagepant
 Ubrogepant

 Antibodies: Eptinezumab
 Erenumab
 Fremanezumab
 Galcanezumab

Cholecystokinin

CCKA
 Agonists: Cholecystokinin

 Antagonists: Amiglumide
 Asperlicin
 Devazepide
 Dexloxiglumide
 Lintitript
 Lorglumide
 Loxiglumide
 Pranazepide
 Proglumide
 Tarazepide
 Tomoglumide

CCKB
 Agonists: Cholecystokinin
 CCK-4
 Gastrin
 Pentagastrin (CCK-5)

 Antagonists: Ceclazepide
 CI-988 (PD-134308)
 Itriglumide
 L-365,360
 Netazepide
 Proglumide
 Spiroglumide

Unsorted
 Antagonists: Nastorazepide

Corticotropin-releasing hormone receptor

CRF1
 Agonists: Cortagine
 Corticorelin
 Corticotropin-releasing hormone
 Sauvagine
 Stressin I
 Urocortin

 Antagonists: Antalarmin
 Astressin-B
 CP-154,526
 Emicerfont
 Hypericin
 LWH-234
 NBI-27914
 NBI-74788
 Pexacerfont
 R-121919
 TS-041
 Verucerfont

CRF2
 Agonists: Corticorelin
 Corticotropin-releasing hormone
 Sauvagine
 Urocortin

 Antagonists: Astressin-B

Cytokine
See here instead.

Endothelin
 Agonists: Endothelin 1
 Endothelin 2
 Endothelin 3
 IRL-1620
 Sarafotoxin

 Antagonists: A-192621
 ACT-132577
 Ambrisentan
 Aprocitentan
 Atrasentan
 Avosentan
 Bosentan
 BQ-123
 BQ-788
 Clazosentan
 Darusentan
 Edonentan
 Enrasentan
 Fandosentan
 Feloprentan
 Macitentan
 Nebentan
 Sitaxentan
 Sparsentan
 Tezosentan
 Zibotentan

Galanin

GAL1
 Agonists: Galanin
 Galanin (1-15)
 Galanin-like peptide
 Galmic
 Galnon
 NAX 810-2

 Antagonists: C7
 Dithiepine-1,1,4,4-tetroxide
 Galantide (M15)
 M32
 M35
 M40
 SCH-202596

GAL2
 Agonists: Galanin
 Galanin (1-15)
 Galanin (2-11)
 Galanin-like peptide
 Galmic
 Galnon
 J18
 NAX 810-2

 Antagonists: C7
 Galantide (M15)
 M32
 M35
 M40
 M871

GAL3
 Agonists: Galanin
 Galanin (1-15)
 Galmic
 Galnon

 Antagonists: C7
 Galantide (M15)
 GalR3ant
 HT-2157
 M32
 M35
 M40
 SNAP-37889
 SNAP-398299

Ghrelin/GHS
 See here instead.

GH
 See here instead.

GHRH
 See here instead.

GLP

GLP-1
 Agonists: Albiglutide
 Beinaglutide
 Dulaglutide
 Efpeglenatide
 Exenatide
 GLP-1
 Langlenatide
 Liraglutide
 Lixisenatide
 Oxyntomodulin
 Pegapamodutide
 Semaglutide
 Taspoglutide

GLP-2
 Agonists: Apraglutide
 Elsiglutide
 Glepaglutide
 GLP-2
 Teduglutide

Others
 Propeptides: Preproglucagon
 Proglucagon

Glucagon
 Agonists: Dasiglucagon
 Glucagon
 Oxyntomodulin

 Antagonists: Adomeglivant
 L-168,049
 LGD-6972

 Propeptides: Preproglucagon
 Proglucagon

GnRH
 See here instead.

Gonadotropin
 See here instead.

Growth factor
 See here instead.

Insulin
 Agonists: Chaetochromin (4548-G05)
 Insulin-like growth factor 1
 Insulin-like growth factor 2
 Insulin
 Insulin aspart
 Insulin degludec
 Insulin detemir
 Insulin glargine
 Insulin glulisine
 Insulin lispro
 Mecasermin
 Mecasermin rinfabate

 Antagonists: BMS-754807
 S661
 S961

 Kinase inhibitors: Linsitinib

 Antibodies: Xentuzumab (against IGF-1 and IGF-2)

Kisspeptin
 Agonists: Kisspeptin
 Kisspeptin-10

 Antagonists: Kisspeptin-234

Leptin
 Agonists: Leptin
 Metreleptin

Melanin-concentrating hormone receptor

MCH1
 Agonists: Melanin-concentrating hormone

 Antagonists: ATC-0065
 ATC-0175
 GW-803430
 NGD-4715
 SNAP-7941
 SNAP-94847

MCH2
 Agonists: Melanin-concentrating hormone

Melanocortin
 See here instead.

mTOR
 Activators: beta-Hydroxy beta-methylbutyric acid
 Hydroxynorketamine
 Leucine
 NV-5138

 Inhibitors: Rapalogs: Everolimus
 Ridaforolimus
 Sirolimus (Rapamycin)
 Temsirolimus
 Umirolimus
 Zotarolimus; ATP-competitive / indirect: Berberine
 Curcumin
 Dactolisib
 EF-24
 Epigallocatechin gallate
 HY-124798
 NV-5440
 Pterostilbene
 Quercetin
 Resveratrol
 Sapanisertib
 Torin-1
 WYE-687
 XL-388

Neuropeptide FF
 Agonists: Neuropeptide AF
 Neuropeptide FF
 Neuropeptide SF (RFRP-1)
 Neuropeptide VF (RFRP-3)

 Antagonists: BIBP-3226
 RF9

Neuropeptide S
 Agonists: Neuropeptide S

 Antagonists: ML-154
 SHA-68

Neuropeptide Y

Y1
 Agonists: Neuropeptide Y
 Peptide YY

 Antagonists: BIBO-3304
 BIBP-3226
 BVD-10
 GR-231118
 PD-160170

Y2
 Agonists: 2-Thiouridine 5'-triphosphate
 Neuropeptide Y
 Neuropeptide Y (13-36)
 Peptide YY
 Peptide YY (3-36)

 Antagonists: BIIE-0246
 JNJ-5207787
 SF-11

Y4
 Agonists: GR-231118
 Neuropeptide Y
 Pancreatic polypeptide
 Peptide YY

 Antagonists: UR-AK49

Y5
 Agonists: BWX-46
 Neuropeptide Y
 Peptide YY

 Antagonists: CGP-71683
 FMS-586
 L-152,804
 Lu AA-33810
 MK-0557
 NTNCB
 Velneperit (S-2367)

Neurotensin

NTS1
 Agonists: 
 Neurotensin
 Neuromedin N
 Antagonists:
 Meclinertant
 SR-142948

NTS2
 Agonists: 
 Neurotensin
 Antagonists: 
 Levocabastine
 SR-142948

Opioid
 See here instead.

Orexin

OX1
 Agonists: Orexin (A, B)

 Antagonists: ACT-335827
 ACT-462206
 Almorexant
 Filorexant
 Lemborexant
 Nemorexant
 RTIOX-276
 SB-334867
 SB-408124
 SB-649868
 Suvorexant
 TCS-1102

OX2
 Agonists: Orexin (A, B)
 SB-668875

 Antagonists: ACT-335827
 ACT-462206
 Almorexant
 EMPA
 Filorexant
 JNJ-10397049
 Lemborexant
 MK-1064
 SB-649868
 Seltorexant
 Suvorexant
 TCS-1102
 TCS-OX2-29

Oxytocin
 See here instead.

Prolactin
 Agonists: Growth hormone
 Human placental lactogen
 Placental growth hormone (growth hormone variant)
 Prolactin
 S179D-hPRL
 Somatotropin

 Antagonists: Δ1–9-G129R-hPRL
 Δ1–14-G129R-hPRL
 G120K-hGH
 G129R-hPRL

 Prolactin modulators: Prolactin inhibitors: D2 receptor agonists (e.g., bromocriptine, cabergoline); Prolactin releasers: D2 receptor antagonists (e.g., domperidone, metoclopramide, risperidone)
 Estrogens (e.g., estradiol)
 Progestogens (e.g., progesterone)

PTH
 Agonists: Abaloparatide
 Parathyroid hormone
 Parathyroid hormone-related protein (PTHrP)
 Semparatide
 Teriparatide

Relaxin
 Agonists: Insulin-like factor 3
 Relaxin (1, 2, 3)
 Serelaxin

Somatostatin
 See here instead.

Tachykinin
 See here instead.

TRH
 Agonists: Azetirelin
 Fertirelin
 Montirelin
 Orotirelin
 Posatirelin
 Protirelin
 Rovatirelin
 Taltirelin
 TRH (TRF)

TSH
 Agonists: Thyrotropin alfa
 TSH (thyrotropin)

Vasopressin
 See here instead.

VIP/PACAP

VIPR1
 Agonists: Peptide: Bay 55-9837
 LBT-3393
 PACAP
 VIP

VIPR2
 Agonists: Peptide: LBT-3627
 PACAP
 VIP

PAC1
 Agonists: PACAP
 PACAP (1-27)
 PACAP (1-38)

 Antagonists: PACAP (6-38)

Unsorted
 PHI
 PHM
 PHV

Others
 Endogenous: Adrenomedullin
 Apelin
 Asprosin
 Bombesin
 Calcitonin
 Carnosine
 CART
 CLIP
 DSIP
 Enteroglucagon
 Formyl peptide
 GALP
 GIP
 GRP
 Integrin ligands (collagens, fibrinogen, fibronectin, laminins, ICAM-1, ICAM-2, osteopontin, VCAM-1, vitronectin)
 Kininogens
 Motilin
 Natriuretic peptides (ANP, BNP, CNP, urodilatin)
 Nesfatin-1
 Neuromedin B
 Neuromedin N
 Neuromedin S
 Neuromedin U
 Obestatin
 Osteocalcin
 Resistin
 Secretin
 Thymopoietin
 Thymosins
 Thymulin
 Urotensin-II
 VGF

 Exogenous: Lifitegrast (LFA-1 antagonist)

References

Receptor modulators
Cell signaling